Albert George Hibbler (August 16, 1915 – April 24, 2001) was an American baritone vocalist, who sang with Duke Ellington's orchestra before having several pop hits as a solo artist. Some of Hibbler's singing is classified as rhythm and blues, but he is best seen as a bridge between R&B and traditional pop music. According to one authority, "Hibbler cannot be regarded as a jazz singer but as an exceptionally good interpreter of twentieth-century popular songs who happened to work with some of the best jazz musicians of the time."

Early life
Hibbler was born in Tyro, Mississippi, United States, and was blind from birth. Some sources give his birth name as Andrew George Hibbler. At the age of 12 he moved to Little Rock, Arkansas, where he attended Arkansas School for the Blind, joining the school choir. Later he began working as a blues singer in local bands, failing his first audition for Duke Ellington in 1935. However, after winning an amateur talent contest in Memphis, Tennessee, he was given his start with Dub Jenkins and his Playmates; Jenkins was a popular Memphis saxophonist and bandleader. He later joined a band led by Jay McShann in 1942, and the following year joined Ellington's orchestra, replacing Herb Jeffries.

Career
He stayed with Ellington for almost eight years, and featured on a range of Ellington standards, including "Do Nothin' Til You Hear From Me", the words for which were written specifically for him and which reached #6 on the Billboard pop chart (and #1 for eight weeks on the "Harlem Hit Parade") in 1944, "I Ain't Got Nothin' But the Blues," and "I'm Just a Lucky So-and-So". Although Hibbler's style was described as "mannered", "over-stated", and "full of idiosyncrasies" and "bizarre vocal pyrotechnics", he was also considered "undoubtedly the best" of Ellington's male vocalists. While with Ellington, Hibbler won the Esquire New Star Award in 1947 and the Down Beat award for Best Band Vocalist in 1949.

Hibbler left Ellington's band in 1951 after a dispute over his wages. He then recorded with various bands including those of Johnny Hodges and Count Basie, and for various labels including Mercury and Norgran, a subsidiary of Verve Records, for whom he released an LP, Al Hibbler Favorites, in 1953.  In 1954 he released a more successful album, Al Hibbler Sings Duke Ellington, and in 1955, he started recording with Decca Records, with immediate success. His biggest hit was "Unchained Melody", which reached #3 on the US pop chart, sold over one million copies, and was awarded a gold disc. Hibbler's version also reached #2 in the UK Singles Chart, becoming his only chart hit in the United Kingdom. Its success led to network appearances, including a live jazz club remote on NBC's Monitor. Other hits were "He" (1955), "11th Hour Melody" and "Never Turn Back" (both in 1956). "After the Lights Go Down Low" (also in 1956) was his last top ten hit.

Activism
In the late 1950s and 1960s, Hibbler became a civil rights activist, marching with protestors and getting arrested in 1959 in New Jersey and in 1963 in Alabama. The notoriety of this activism discouraged major record labels from carrying his work, but Frank Sinatra supported him and signed him to a contract with his label, Reprise Records. However, Hibbler made very few recordings after that, occasionally doing live appearances through the 1990s. In 1971, Hibbler sang two songs at Louis Armstrong's funeral. In 1972 he made an album, A Meeting of the Times, with another fiercely independent blind musician, the multi-instrumentalist Rahsaan Roland Kirk.

Death and legacy
He died at Holy Cross Hospital in Chicago in 2001, at the age of 85. He is buried at Lincoln Cemetery in Blue Island, Illinois.

Discography

Solo singles discography

Albums
 Sings Duke Ellington (Norgran, 1954)
 Favorites (Norgran, 1954)
 Melodies by Al Hibbler (Argo, 1956)
 Sings Love Songs (Verve, 1956)
 Starring Al Hibbler (Decca, 1956)
 After the Lights Go Down Low, (Atlantic, 1957)
 Here's Hibbler (Decca, 1957)
 I Surrender Dear (Score, 1957)
 Torchy and Blue (Decca, 1958)
 Al Hibbler Remembers (Decca, 1958)
 Hits by Hibbler (Decca, 1958)
 Sings the Blues: Monday Every Day (Reprise, 1961)
 Big Boy Blues (Grand Prix Series, 1964)
 Shades of Blue (Sunset, 1968)
  A Meeting of the Times with Rahsaan Roland Kirk (Atlantic, 1972)
 Christmas with (Holiday, 1981)
 Solitude (Pickwick, 1997)

With Count Basie
 Basie Jazz, Clef MGC-633, 1954 (recordings from 1952)

Compilations
 The Chronological Al Hibbler 1946–1949 Classics, 2002)
 The Chronological Al Hibbler 1950–1952 (Classics, 2003)

See also
List of artists under the Decca Records label
List of artists who reached number one on the Billboard R&B chart
List of artists who reached number one on the Australian singles chart
List of people from Little Rock, Arkansas

References

External links
 
 Al Hibbler Discography

1915 births
2001 deaths
American rhythm and blues musicians
Atlantic Records artists
Big band singers
Blind musicians
Chess Records artists
Decca Records artists
Duke Ellington Orchestra members
Musicians from Arkansas
People from Tate County, Mississippi
Top Rank Records artists
Traditional pop music singers
American male jazz musicians
Aladdin Records artists
Reprise Records artists
20th-century American male singers
20th-century American singers